Raimo Johan Hilding Karlsson (18 February 1948 in Helsinki – 27 February 2007 in Phuket) was a Finnish wrestler who competed in the 1972 Summer Olympics.

References

External links
 

1948 births
2007 deaths
Olympic wrestlers of Finland
Wrestlers at the 1972 Summer Olympics
Finnish male sport wrestlers
Sportspeople from Helsinki